Linda Gail Lewis (born July 18, 1947) is an American singer, songwriter and pianist. She has recorded with Stephen Ackles, Van Morrison, and with her brother, Jerry Lee Lewis. She also has recorded with her two daughters, MaryJean Ferguson and Annie Marie Dolan, in a group called the Lewis 3. She is married to Eddie Braddock, former Stax promotions director.

Discography

Albums

Singles

Music videos

As "The Lewis 3"
 Perfect World (Ame Dane/Castle Music) (2006)
 Merry Christmas From Nashville (Benlin Music) (2006)

Import CDs
 Think Twice Before You Go (Swingin' Pig) (2001) (with Van Morrison)
 The Early Sides of Linda Gail Lewis (Smash Records) (2005)
 Early Rocking Country Days (Jukebox Records) (2005)

Videos and DVDs
 The Jerry Lee Lewis Show (various labels) guest appearance
 Jerry Lee Lewis – I Am What I Am (various labels) guest appearance
 Micke Muster – Live! (Silverrock Music) (2004) guest appearance
 Jerry Lee Lewis – Killer Piano (Alfred Publishing Co.) (2007) guest appearance
 The Queen of Rock 'n' Roll Live in France (Big Beat Records) (2007)
 The Many Sounds of Jerry Lee (ClassicCountryDVD) (2010) guest appearance

External links
Official website
Rockabilly Hall of Fame site
Tour schedule

Living people
American country singer-songwriters
American women country singers
American rockabilly musicians
Smash Records artists
1947 births
21st-century American women